Aarne Tapani Kansa (born 9 March 1949 in Hamina, Finland) is a Finnish singer.

Career
Tapani Kansa made his first record deal in 1967 and had a breakthrough the next year, with his version of the hit song Delilah, translated into Finnish. Tapani Kansa had established a career in singing at a very young age. He had started studying singing in the Kotka music academy in the middle 1960s. His colourful performance style brought him much work on television. His early hit songs include Kuljen taas kotiinpäin ("I am walking home again"), Eloise and Käymme yhdessä ain ("We will always go together"). In 1976, Tapani Kansa achieved great success with his songs R-A-K-A-S ("D-E-A-R"), Hafanana and Melina. The next year he released the album Mistä rakkaus alkoi ("Where did the love start"), which presented a more pop music style Tapani Kansa: The album contains a Finnish version of Elton John's song Sorry Seems To Be The Hardest Word - in Finnish Anteeksi on vaikea pyytää ("It is hard to apologise").

The 1970s brought rock and roll and show music to Kansa's concerts. Hits of the time included Rokkivaari Hotanen ("Hotanen, the rocking grandpa", translated from Daddy Cool by Darts) and Kalajoen hiekat ("The sands of Kalajoki", translated from California Dreamin' by The Mamas & the Papas). Veikko Nieminen brought a more sociological aspect to the lyrics in connection with the new age.

Tapani Kansa also studied singing at the Sibelius Academy from 1974 to 1978, and in the late 1970s, he enlarged his repertoire: The album Moment Musical (1978) was made in co-operation with Heikki Sarmanto, who arranged a musical version of Eino Leino's lyrics into the album. Another artist on the album was Maija Hapuoja. In 1987, Kansa recorded the classic Hopeinen Kuu ("Silver Moon") and the album Betonimylläri, containing poetry by Lauri Viita. 1988 brought Oskari Merikannon kauneimmat laulut. The album Kultaniityt (1994 introduced, among some translated songs, also Tapani Kansa as a songwriter. On the album Päivä jolloin rakastat ("The day you love", 1999), Kansa interpreted Argentinian tangos, while Valaistu ikkuna ("The lit window") included Finnish film songs. The album Salaisuudessain ("In my secret", 2002) was a return to the pop music style, and a new direction came in autumn 2004, when Tapani Kansa interpreted Tapio Rautavaara's songs on the album Tapsa ja Rautavaara.

In 2002, Tapani Kansa appeared in the Pojat group formed by Danny and Markku Aro, performing hit songs by the artists from the 1960s.

In 2006, Kansa released the album Kulkumies ("The traveller"), which he wrote the lyrics to and co-arranged the melodies with Kassu Halonen. In the same year, Kansa was nominated for the Iskelmä-Finlandia prize.

Tapani Kansa has written and arranged his own works. He has also appeared on theatre and operettas and acted on TV. In 1987, Kansa was awarded the Erikois-Emma prize.

Discography

Albums

Personal life
Kansa is of partial Russian descent.

See also
List of best-selling music artists in Finland

References
 Latva - Tuunainen: Iskelmän tähtitaivas. 500 suomalaista viihdetaiteilijaa. WSOY, 2004
 The Helmet Internet library

Notes

External links
 Official site
 Tapani Kansa at Pomus.net
 YLE / Elävä arkisto: Tapani Kansa Jatkoajassa
 Tapani Kansa at Last.fm

1949 births
Living people
People from Hamina
21st-century Finnish male singers
Finnish people of Russian descent
20th-century Finnish male singers